Giuseppe Accoramboni JUD (24 September 1672 – 21 March 1747) was an Italian Cardinal who served as bishop of Imola.

Accoramboni was born in Castel de Preci, diocese of Spoleto and was baptised on the same day. He was educated that the University of Perugia where he earned a  doctorate in utroque iure, (both canon and civil law) on 6 May 1694.

Early life
He worked as an auditor of Michelangelo Cardinal Conti future Pope Innocent XIII. He also served as a Sub-datary of His Holiness from 1721. He was a canon of the patriarchal Vatican basilica and worked at the Sacred Roman Rota.

He was ordained on 14 February 1723. He served on the Supreme Tribunals of the Apostolic Signatura and of Grace,

Episcopate
He was appointed archbishop of Filippi in partibus infidelium on 11 September 1724 and was consecrated on 21 September by Pope Benedict XIII with Mondilio Orsini, Titular Archbishop of Corinthus, and Pierre-Guérin de Tencin, Archbishop of Embrun, serving as co-consecrators. He served as a consultor of the Ss.CC. of Rites and of the Roman and Universal Inquisition. He was transferred to the see of Imola, with personal title of archbishop and retaining all his other posts on 12 April 1728.

Cardinalate
He was created and proclaimed Cardinal-Priest of S. Maria in Traspontina in the consistory of 20 September 1728. He participated in the conclave of 1730, which elected Pope Clement XII. He was also able to participate in the conclave of 1740, which elected Pope Benedict XIV. He was appointed to the order of Cardinal-Bishops taking the suburbicarian see of Frascati on 11 March 1743.

He died in 1747, around 9 p.m. His body was exposed in the church of S. Ignazio, Rome, and buried in that same church.

References

External links
Cardinals of the Holy Roman Church

1672 births
1747 deaths
18th-century Italian cardinals
Bishops of Imola
Cardinal-bishops of Frascati
People from Spoleto